Thomas Ryburn Buchanan PC FRSE (2 April 1846 – 7 April 1911) was a Scottish Liberal politician and bibliophile.

Background and education

He was born in Glasgow the son of John Buchanan of Dowanhill. His brother was the eminent chemist and explorer John Young Buchanan (1844-1925).

He was educated at Sherborne School and Balliol College, Oxford. He later became a Fellow of All Souls College, Oxford, and was called to the Bar.

Political career
In 1880 Buchanan unsuccessfully contested Haddington in the 1880 general election but was successfully returned to Parliament for Edinburgh in an 1881 by-election. This constituency was abolished in 1885 and he was elected for the newly created constituency of Edinburgh West as a Liberal Unionist. However, in 1888 Buchanan announced that he supported William Ewart Gladstone's Home Rule policy. He resigned his seat and was elected by a narrow majority as a Gladstonian and Home Ruler the same year.

Buchanan lost the Edinburgh West seat in 1892 but returned to the House of Commons in December the same year when he was elected to represent Aberdeenshire East in a by-election. He lost this seat in the 1900 general election and remained out of the House of Commons for the next three years. However, in February 1903 he was returned as the member for Perthshire East, a seat he held until 1910. When the Liberals came to power in December 1905 he was appointed Financial Secretary to the War Office by Prime Minister Sir Henry Campbell-Bannerman, a post he retained until April 1908. The latter month he was sworn of the Privy Council and made Under-Secretary of State for India by the new Prime Minister, H. H. Asquith. He remained in this post until June 1909.

Personal life
Buchanan married Emily Octavia Bolitho on 15 August 1888 at Madron, Penzance, Cornwall. He lived at 10 Moray Place on the prestigious Moray Estate in Edinburgh's West End and 12 South Street in Mayfair. He was a noted collector of books and manuscripts. Some of his collections were donated by his widow to the University of Edinburgh and the Bodleian Library, Oxford, after his death. He died on 7 April 1911 in Bournemouth in Hampshire and was buried in the churchyard of St Bartholomew's Church at Arborfield in Berkshire where his sister lived.

References

Brief biography at Edinburgh University Library

External links 

1846 births
1911 deaths
Scottish Liberal Party MPs
People educated at Sherborne School
Alumni of Balliol College, Oxford
Fellows of All Souls College, Oxford
UK MPs 1880–1885
UK MPs 1885–1886
UK MPs 1886–1892
UK MPs 1892–1895
UK MPs 1895–1900
UK MPs 1900–1906
UK MPs 1906–1910
Members of the Parliament of the United Kingdom for Edinburgh constituencies
Liberal Unionist Party MPs for Scottish constituencies
Members of the Privy Council of the United Kingdom